The National Framework of Qualifications (NFQ) is a system used to describe levels of educational qualifications in Ireland.  Responsibility for maintaining and developing the framework lies with Quality and Qualifications Ireland (QQI).

Launched in 2003, the NFQ was developed by the National Qualifications Authority of Ireland as a means of comparing training and qualifications between institutions of education at all levels.  It encompasses learning at primary and second level, as well as acting as a benchmark for required standards for graduates of courses offered by  QQI, and universities.  The framework consists of 10 "Levels", ranging from Certificates at Level 1 which signify initial learning to degrees at doctoral level.  A 'fan diagram' is used to illustrate the progression of the levels.

Framework

References

External links 
National Framework of Qualifications website
Relationship between the Common European Framework of Reference for Languages and the National Framework of Qualifications

Academic transfer
Education in the Republic of Ireland
Educational qualifications in Ireland